SZNZ: Spring is the seventh EP by American rock band Weezer, and the first of four EPs in their SZNZ (pronounced "seasons") project. It was released digitally on March 20, 2022, coinciding with the spring equinox. A physical version was released on CD later the same year, with a vinyl release in early 2023. The EP produced one single, titled "A Little Bit of Love".

Background 
The SZNZ concept was first revealed by Rivers Cuomo in an interview in January 2021. Cuomo stated that he wanted the Spring album to feature a "Happy, chill, stress-free" theme, later expressing a desire for an "acoustic, breezy" song in a similar vein to "Island in the Sun."

On February 2, 2022, Cuomo shared a Google spreadsheet with fans which included the release dates, possible producers, overall emotion, spirituality tone, planned genre, and planned singles for each of the SZNZ EP. Spring's emotion was set to be optimistic sorrow. The spreadsheet also included the band's look and the aesthetic era the clothes and EP are based on. Aesthetically, the band linked SZNZ: Spring to a pre-Christian era with influences from Celts, Paganism, and Wicca.

Release 
On March 16, 2022, Weezer released the lead single, "A Little Bit Of Love". On March 16, Cuomo used his game, Weezle (a Weezer-themed spin on the popular web game Wordle), to preview snippets of the forthcoming Spring songs.

SZNZ: Spring was officially released on March 20, 2022, the day of the Spring Equinox.

Critical reception

SZNZ: Spring received generally favorable reviews from music critics. At Metacritic, which assigns a normalized rating out of 100 to reviews from mainstream publications, the album received an average score of 63 based on 7 reviews, indicating "generally favorable reviews". In a mixed review, Alex Hudson at Exclaim! stated that, while not the worst Weezer album, "it's frustrating to hear them sabotaging their own songs in a futile attempt to pin down the sound of a season. So far, SZNZ feels less like a lofty concept and more like silly gimmick." Brady Gerber of Pitchfork was more critical, opining "unlike the expensive-sounding and often pretty OK Human—and a rarity for any proper Weezer release—SZNZ sounds cheap." However, Gerber considered the tracks "A Little Bit of Love" and "Wild at Heart" highlights of the album.

Track listing

Personnel
Weezer
 Rivers Cuomo – lead vocals, guitars, backing vocals
 Patrick Wilson – drums
 Brian Bell – guitars, backing vocals
 Scott Shriner – bass, backing vocals

Technical
 Jake Sinclair – production
 Suzy Shinn – production
 Ethan Gruska – production
 Bernie Grundman – mastering
 John Sinclair – mixing (1, 2, 4–7)
 Rob Kinelski – mixing (3)
 Rouble Kapoor – engineering
 Jason Hiller – engineering
 Rachel White – engineering
 JC LeResche – engineering
 Sejo Navajas – engineering assistance

Charts

Notes

References 

2022 EPs
Weezer EPs
Atlantic Records EPs
Folk rock albums by American artists